Gollapally (also referred as Gollapalle or Gollapalli) is a village located in Gollapalle mandal of Jagtial district in Telangana, India. Before the reorganisation of districts in Telangana, Gollapally was part of Karimnagar district. And in this village there is a river named ganga

Demographics
According to 2011 Census, village has a total population of 5,172, with 2,512 males and 2,660 females.

References

Villages in Jagtial district